Sri (also spelled Shri & Shree) is a rāga belonging to the tradition of Odissi music. Falling under the meḷa of the same name, the raga uses komala nisada swara and is traditionally associated with the melancholic karuna rasa. The raga is mentioned in treatises such as the Gita Prakasa and Sangita Narayana. Among its angaragas, Dhanasri, Bangalasri, Karunasri, Malasri, Madhusri, Dakhinasri are well-known.

Structure 
An ancient raga, Sri has been used by hundreds of poet-composers for well-over the past many centuries. Its aroha-abaroha are given below :

Aroha : S R M P n S

Abaroha : S n D P M G R S

The raga dwells or does nyasa on the rusabha, as per tradition.

Compositions 
Some of the well-known traditional compositions in this raga include :

 Syama Pritire Sajani by Dinakrusna Dasa
 Kaha Ki Upaya Aau by Benudhara
 Jaa Jaa Tu Chhuan Na by Gopalakrusna

References 

Ragas of Odissi music